Odette Teissier du Cros ( Cololian, 1906 – January 30, 1997) was a French ethnologist, who founded and was the first curator (1963–83) of the  (Cévennes Museum) in Le Vigan.

Biography
Initially planning to make a career in medicine, she turned later to ethnology, a new discipline at that time.

In 1922, she met Louis Teissier du Cros a native of Aulas, at Bois de Boulogne in Paris. The Teissier du Cros family members were silk spinners from the hamlet of Cros, Gard. The couple married shortly before World War II.

During the Occupation, she lived in Paris, and her husband being a prisoner in Germany (Oflag IV-D). In order to survive, she became a part of the folk art community. After the war, she regularly stayed in the Cévennes with her new family, at the Teissier du Cros house (in Aulas), and at the château de Coupiac (in Saint-Sauveur-Camprieu).

In September 1961, the municipality of Le Vigan organized the exhibition  (The old Cevennes techniques), its prelude to the opening of the Cévenol Museum, of which Teissier was the essential organizer. The Cévennes Museum was inaugurated on September 5, 1963, in the presence of several personalities including Georges Henri Rivière, André Chamson, and Claude Lévi-Strauss. With the assistance of Durand-Tullou, Teissler collected the objects that for the museum's collection, which include archaeology, ethnology, history, literature, and textiles pieces.

Death and legacy
Odette Teissier du Cros died January 30, 1997. Biographical panels created in her honour were dedicated at the Cévenol Museum on 26 July 2013.

Awards and honours 
 Knight, Legion of Honour, 26 February 1978
 Knight, Ordre des Arts et des Lettres, 8 February 1968
 Medal, 10 September 1972
 Corresponding member, 8 June 1978

Selected works 
Le Musée cévenol : Le Vigan, Gard, Le Vigan, Musée cévenol, 1980

References

External links
 Musée cévenol website

1906 births
1997 deaths
French ethnologists
French curators
Museum founders
Chevaliers of the Ordre des Arts et des Lettres
Chevaliers of the Légion d'honneur
École du Louvre alumni
French women curators